Direct 8 was a national French TV channel, owned by Vincent Bolloré. It was available through digital terrestrial television network "TNT" and the Astra 1H satellite position.

As the name suggests ('direct' is French for 'live'), Direct 8 was originally intended to broadcast live shows only (except during night times and holiday seasons). This is no longer the case.

Following its purchase by Canal Group, the channel closed down on 7 October 2012 and relaunched as D8.

See also
 D8 (TV channel)

References

  Direct 8 devient une « vraie » concurrente
  Direct 8, Nicolas, les femmes et le coup de ciseau - 20minutes.fr
  Direct 8 s'offre l'équipe de France Espoirs, actualité Médias 2.0 : Le Point
  Direct 8 : la chaîne du direct - télévision - la-Croix.com
  Programmes TV - «Direct 8 est devenue un média de masse» - Divertissement - Le Figaro TV

External links
 Official Site  (broken, redirected to D8 website)
 Live streaming video of Direct 8 (not available during movies)

Defunct television channels in France
Television channels and stations established in 2001
Television channels and stations established in 2005
Television channels and stations disestablished in 2012
French-language television stations
2001 establishments in France
2005 establishments in France
2012 disestablishments in France